Hickelia is a genus of African bamboo in the grass family.

Species
 Hickelia africana S.Dransf. - Tanzania
 Hickelia alaotrensis A.Camus - Madagascar
 Hickelia madagascariensis A.Camus - Madagascar
 Hickelia perrieri (A.Camus) S.Dransf. - Madagascar

References

Bambusoideae
Bambusoideae genera
Flora of Africa
Taxa named by Aimée Antoinette Camus